The Utrechts Conservatorium is a Conservatory of Music in Utrecht, Netherlands and part of the Utrecht School of the Arts (HKU). The conservatory opened in 1875 and is one of the eldest professional musical education institutes of the Netherlands. Since 1971, the conservatory is located in the former concert hall Gebouw voor Kunsten en Wetenschappen (Building for Arts and Science) and in the former hospital St. Joannes de Deo, both on the same street. Apart from these two buildings, the Nederlandse Beiaardschool (Dutch Carillon School), located in Amersfoort, is also part of the school.
The Utrechts Conservatorium merged in 1987 with the Carillon School and the Nederlands Instituut voor Kerkmuziek (Dutch Institute for Church Music) into the Faculty of music of the Utrecht School of the Arts.

The conservatory has six study directions:
 Bachelor of Music in Jazz & Pop
 Bachelor of Music in Classical Music
 Historical Performance
 Carillon
 Bachelor of Music in Education
 Musician 3.0 (experimental music)

Musicians

Notable alumni 
Tristan Keuris
Janine Jansen
Herman van Veen
Wouter Hamel
Peter Kardolus
Bas Ramselaar
Gerard Beljon - Composer
Rudjer Glavurtic - Composer

Notable faculty 
Philippe Hirschhorn
Ton de Leeuw
Charlotte Margiono
Emmy Verhey
Zino Vinnikov
Piet Noordijk

External links
 The official HKU website

Music schools in the Netherlands
Buildings and structures in Utrecht (city)
Utrecht School of the Arts
1875 establishments in Europe